This is a list of Polish television related events from 2011.

Events
6 March - Launch of the Polish version of The X Factor.
5 June - Gienek Loska wins the first series of X Factor.
26 November - 19-year-old singer Kacper Sikora wins the fourth series of Mam talent!.
27 November - M jak miłość actor Kacper Kuszewski and his partner Anna Głogowska win the thirteenth series of Taniec z Gwiazdami.
6 December - Damian Ukeje wins the first series of The Voice of Poland.

Debuts

Domestic
6 March - X Factor (2011–present)
3 September - The Voice of Poland (2011–present)

International

Television shows

1990s
Klan (1997–present)

2000s
M jak miłość (2000–present)
Na Wspólnej (2003–present)
Pierwsza miłość (2004–present)
Dzień Dobry TVN (2005–present)
Mam talent! (2008–present)

Ending this year
Taniec z gwiazdami (2005-2011, 2014–present)

Births

Deaths

See also
2011 in Poland